The Baltic States Swimming Championships is an annual swimming competition between best swimmers from Baltic states: Lithuania, Latvia and Estonia.

The championships are typically held over two days early in the year and serve as a key stepping stone for many athletes on their journey to international competition.

Team scoring

Youth and Junior age group 
In 2023, two (2) fastest swimmers from each country in each gender and age group bring points for their team in individual events as follows: 1st place – 7 points, 2nd – 5 points, 3rd – 4 points, 4th – 3 points, 5th – 2 points, 6th – 1 point. The fastest relay team from each country in each gender and age group bring points for their team in relay events in each session as follows: 1st place – 14 points, 2nd – 10 points, 3rd – 8 points.

Open age group 
In 2023, eight (8) fastest swimmers from final A in each gender bring points for their team in individual events as
follows:

The fastest relay team from each country in each gender bring points for their team in relay events in
each session as follows:

Championships 
The list is incomplete

Events 
Freestyle: 50 m, 100 m, 200 m, 400 m
Backstroke: 50 m, 100 m, 200 m
Breaststroke: 50 m, 100 m, 200 m
Butterfly: 50 m, 100 m, 200 m
Individual medley: 200 m, 400 m
Relay: 4×100 m free, 4×100 m medley

See also
List of Baltic records in swimming

References 

 
International swimming competitions
Swimming in Estonia
Swimming in Latvia
Swimming in Lithuania
Sport in the Baltic states